Spiegel & Grau was originally a publishing imprint of Penguin Random House founded by Celina Spiegel and Julie Grau in 2005. 

On January 25, 2019, Penguin Random House announced that the imprint was being shut down and the two founders were leaving. While commercially successful, the imprint "became yet another casualty of corporate restructuring," according to the New York Times.

In 2020, founders Celina Spiegel and Julie Grau resurrected their publishing house under the name Spiegel & Grau. They said the independent publisher will produce 15 to 20 books a year, as well as original audiobooks and podcasts.

Authors
Writers whose work has been published under its imprint include the following:

 Saher Alam
 Jennifer Arnold 	
 M. K. Asante
 Tash Aw
 Stephen Batchelor 	
 Dan Baum	
 Elaine Beale 	
 Nate Berkus
 Anthony Bozza 	
 Diane Brady
 Joseph Braude 	
 Joe Brewster 	
 Janelle Brown
 Mike Brown
 Leslie T. Chang	
 Ta-Nehisi Coates 	
 Edward Conlon 	
 Karen Connelly
 Sampson Davis 	
 Rob Delaney	
 Gary Dell'Abate 	
 Barbara Demick 	
 Beth Ditto	
 Dagmara Dominczyk	
 Ellen Feldman 	
 Shelley Frisch
 Miriam Gershow 	
 Clio Goodman	
 Emily Fox Gordon 	
 David Graeber	
 Cary Groner
 Sara Gruen
 Christina Haag 	
 Hilary Thayer Hamann
 Yuval Noah Harari
 Václav Havel	
 Jane Hedley-Prole 	
 Ayaan Hirsi Ali	
 Eddie Huang
 David Javerbaum 	
 Jay-Z
 Jeff Johnson 	
 Mary Johnson
 Mat Johnson
 Jane Kamensky 	
 Piper Kerman
 Sana Krasikov	
 Nicholas D. Kristof 	
 Lang Lang	
 Artie Lange	
 Adam Langer	
 Victor LaValle 	
 Aliza Lavie
 Jill Lepore	
 James A. Levine 	
 Elizabeth Little	
 Mike Loew
 Phillip Lopate 	
 Meg Lukens Noonan
 Norm Macdonald
 Somaly Mam
 Ndaba Mandela 	
 Adam Mansbach	
 Marc Maron
 Yann Martel	
 James Maskalyk 	
 Jerry McGill
 Philipp Meyer	
 Barry Michels	
 Chad Millman
 Liza Monroy
 Wes Moore
 Tracy Morgan
 Grant Morrison 	
 Patricia Morrisroe 	
 John Moynihan
 Blake Mycoskie	
 Jeanne Nolan	
 Trevor Noah
 Arika Okrent
 Suze Orman
 Lisa Frazier Page 	
 Iain Pears
 Joseph Peter 	
 Sidney Poitier 	
 Richard David Precht 	
 Jessica Queller
 Beth Raymer
 Steven Rinella 	
 David Ritz
 Jim Robbins	
 Margaret Robison 	
 Nile Rodgers	
 Domenica Ruta	
 Sharon Sakson	
 Catherine Sanderson 	
 Ari Shavit
 Lee Siegel	
 Warren St. John 	
 Michelle Stephenson 	
 Howard Stern
 Bryan Stevenson
 Caroline Stoessinger 	
 Rebecca Stott
 Phil Stutz
 Adeena Sussman 	
 D. F. Swaab
 Marianne Szegedy-Maszak
 Matt Taibbi
 Michelle Tea
 Alison Thompson 	
 Steve Toltz
 Karen Valby
 Elise Valmorbida
 Shankar Vedantam
 Michael Walker	
 Carol Wallace	
 Alice Waters

Notes

References

External links
Spiegel and Grau

Random House
Publishing companies established in 2008
Book publishing companies based in New York City